Hòa Lợi may refer to several places in Vietnam, including:

 Hòa Lợi, Bình Dương, a ward of Bến Cát.
 Hòa Lợi, Bến Tre, a rural commune of Thạnh Phú District.
 Hòa Lợi, Kiên Giang, a rural commune of Giồng Riềng District.
 Hòa Lợi, Trà Vinh, a rural commune of Châu Thành District.